Bethany Township is a township in Harrison County, in the U.S. state of Missouri.

Bethany Township takes its name from the community of Bethany, Missouri.

References

Townships in Missouri
Townships in Harrison County, Missouri